Dangerbird Records is an independent record label in Los Angeles, California. The label is home to artists from around the world and part of the burgeoning Silver Lake music scene. The label has had international success from its small roster of artists including Silversun Pickups, Fitz and the Tantrums, Sebadoh, Minus the Bear, and The Frights

History

The two founders represented different roles in the music industry. Jeff Castelaz had managed Feist, Phoenix, Citizen King, and others, while Peter Walker was a singer-songwriter. The label's first release: Walker's solo album Landed.

Their business approach includes a strong emphasis on artist development, and working with a network of partners to help the bands reach a wide market.

In 2006, Dangerbird gained repute after releasing Carnavas, the debut full-length album by Silversun Pickups, to sales of over 450,000. The band's lead singer Brian Aubert has said of Dangerbird, "They believe in careers, and the long haul - something that majors used to believe in. They stuck with us when most people wouldn't have."

On September 14, 2012, co-founder Peter Walker announced the promotion of Jenni Sperandeo to President and the departure of co-founder Jeff Castelaz. Sperandeo said in a statement, "After nearly 20 years in radio promotion, management and artist development, I am thrilled for the opportunity to step into this more comprehensive role at a rare, artist-driven enterprise."

Artists

Current roster 

 A Grape Dope
 Arthur King
 Bill Baird
 Coleman Zurkowski
 The Colorist Orchestra & Howe Gelb
 Cones
 Criminal Hygiene
Danny Frankel, Victoria Williams, Doug Wieselman
 The Dears
 Dev Ray
 Grandaddy
 Hank May
 Harry the Nightgown
 Holly Miranda
 Jason Lytle
 Joel Jerome
 Joel Jeromino, Jimi Cabeza de Vaca
 Jordi
 Juiceboxxx
 Matt Costa
 Milly
 Mirrorball
 Murray A. Lightburn
 Night Shop

 NO WIN
 People Flavor
 Peter Walker, David Ralicke, Danny Frankel
 Randy Randall
 *repeat repeat
 Sea Wolf
 Sebadoh
 Slothrust
 Slow Mass
 Spain
 Spring Summer
 Swervedriver
 Tim Rutili
 Total Heat
 Touchy
 Unicorns at Heart

Former Roster

 A. Sinclair
 All Smiles
 Arthur King and the Night Sea
 Bad Veins
 Beady Eye (US/Canada)
 Ben Lee
 Blonde Summer
 Boots Electric
 Broadheads
 Butch Walker
 Codeine Velvet Club
 Dappled Cities
 Darker My Love
 Delphic
 Division Day
 Ed Laurie
 Eric Avery
 Eulogies
 Fitz and the Tantrums
 The Frights
 The Fling
 Hot Hot Heat
 JJAMZ
 Jesse Harris

 Maxwell, Miranda, Parsley
 Minus the Bear
 Midnight Faces
 Moke Hill
 Nav/Attack
 Peter Walker
 Royal Teeth
 Richie Sambora 
 Sabrosa Purr
 Silversun Pickups
 Skysaw
 T. Hardy Morris 
 The Fling
 The Frights
 The Limousines
 The Night Sea
 The One AM Radio
 The Promise Ring
 UME
 Joy Zipper
 La Rocca
 Maritime

See also
 List of record labels

References 

 MarketWatch.com - "Dangerbird Records Catalog is Newest Addition to DeliRadio"
 Style Section LA - "A Rare Bird"
 HypeBot.com - "DropKick Murphys, Dangerbird Records Talk D.I.Y. & Fan Engagement With Ian Rogers"
 ArtHouseMusic.com - "Dangerbird Records"
 Buzzbands.la - "Dangerbird Records’ eight-band day party raises $2,500 for the Pablove Foundation"
 Billboard Magazine - "Piero Giramonti Named Dangerbird Records President"
 The Comet - "Dangerbird Records and Reach Music Enter Publishing Agreement"
 PR Newswire - "Fontana Partners with Dangerbird Records"
 PlugInMusic.com - "Dangerbird Records Soar into SXSW"
 Racked.com - "Branding the Band: Dangerbird's Darker My Love Promo"
 ABC News - "Dangerbird Records Founder on a Mission Against Cancer"

External links
 

Alternative rock record labels
American independent record labels
Indie rock record labels